Two Weeks is a 2013 South Korean television series starring Lee Joon-gi, Kim So-yeon, Ryu Soo-young, Park Ha-sun, Kim Hye-ok, Jo Min-ki and Lee Chae-mi. It aired on MBC from August 7 to September 26, 2013 on Wednesdays and Thursdays at 21:55 for 16 episodes.

Synopsis
Jang Tae-san is a small-time gangster who has learned to survive with his fist and wits. He meets and falls in love with a college student, Seo In-hye, who sees a good heart and wounded soul underneath his tough exterior. When In-hye gets pregnant, Tae-san prepares to leave the gangster organization to start a life with her. But he is blackmailed by the gang boss, Moon Il-seok, who wants Tae-san to be his fall guy for an assault charge and go to prison in his place; Il-seok threatens to kill In-hye if Tae-san refuses. So Tae-san tells In-hye to get an abortion and cruelly breaks up with her, then goes off to prison for several years.

Eight years later, Tae-san is running a small pawnshop. One day, In-hye unexpectedly pays him a visit and tells him that she cut ties with her disapproving family and had the baby after all. But her daughter Soo-jin has been diagnosed with leukemia and needs a bone marrow transplant. Since she isn't a match, that leaves Tae-san. Reeling from the discovery that he's a father and wanting to do something good for once in his meaningless life, Tae-san agrees to the undergo the surgery, which is scheduled to take place in two weeks. But he becomes embroiled in political intrigue when Il-seok conspires with a corrupt politician Jo Seo-hee to frame Tae-san for the murder of an undercover agent, who had infiltrated the gang under the orders of prosecutor Park Jae-kyung. Tae-san is arrested by detective Im Seung-woo, who happens to be In-hye's current fiancé. While being transported, the police car he's in gets into an accident and Tae-san escapes. Now a fugitive, he is hunted by both the police and an assassin, and what ensues is two weeks of his desperate struggle to save his life and his daughter's.

Cast

Main
Lee Joon-gi – Jang Tae-san 
Orphaned at a young age when his father left and his mother committed suicide, Tae-san became a small-time gangster. After getting falsely accused of murder and learning that he has a daughter with leukemia, Tae-san spends the next two weeks in a life-or-death struggle to save himself and the girl.

Kim So-yeon – Park Jae-kyung 
A smart and warmhearted prosecutor who is determined to find out the truth about Jang Tae-san's murder case. She soon becomes convinced of his innocence and tries to help him.

Ryu Soo-young – Im Seung-woo
A talented detective who comes from a long line of police officers in his family. He's leading the police manhunt for the fugitive Jang Tae-san, and is In-hye's current boyfriend.

Park Ha-sun – Seo In-hye 
She is the first love Tae-san can't forget, and unbeknownst to him, In-hye raised their daughter Soo-jin as a single mother for eight years. After Soo-jin's leukemia diagnosis, In-hye and Tae-san embark on a race against the clock to save their daughter's life.

Kim Hye-ok – Jo Seo-hee
A corrupt politician who earns her money through companies managed by Moon Il-suk.

Jo Min-ki – Moon Il-seok
A businessman with seemingly legit business interests, but is deep down a cruel and heartless man who will do everything to silence Jang Tae-san, who knows his secret.

Lee Chae-mi – Seo Soo-jin
In-hye and Tae-san's eight-year-old daughter who has leukemia. She also hopes of meeting her father someday.

Supporting
Song Jae-rim – Mr. Kim
A professional assassin who has served in the French Foreign Legion, who is hired by his father Il-seok to kill Tae-san before he's captured by the authorities.

Kim Hyo-seo – Park Ji-sook
Soo-jin's doctor.

Um Hyo-sup – Han Jung-woo
Chief prosecutor.

Yoon Hee-seok – Do Sang-hoon
A prosecutor. He is Jae-kyung's senior colleague, and a Daddy-Long-Legs figure to her.

Yeo Ui-joo – Kim Min-soo
Jung In-gi – Yang Taek-nam
Baek Seung-hoon – Kim Sang-ho
Ahn Yong-joon – Jin Il-do
Rookie cop.

Im Se-mi – Oh Mi-sook
A bar girl who was working undercover for Jae-kyung. She is murdered by Il-seok, and Tae-san is framed for her death.

Park Joo-hyung – Im Hyung-jin
Kim Bup-rae – Hwang Dae-joon
Kim Young-choon – Jang Seok-doo
Chun Ho-jin – Han Chi-gook
Ahn Se-ha – Go Man-seok
Tae-san's best friend.

Bae Je-ki – Jo Dae-ryong
Park Ha-na – Jang Young-ja
Kang Ha-neul – Kim Sung-joon
Seo-hee's son that Jae-kyung flew to Chicago in search of.

Hyun Nam – So-young
Nam Kyung-eup – Im Ki-ho
Ahn Daniel – Student
Greena Park – Woman in labor
Go In-beom – Jae-kyung's father
Seo Yi-sook – Deaf woman
Chae Bin – Deaf woman's daughter

Original soundtrack

Part 1

Part 2

Part 3

Part 4

Part 5

Part 6

Part 7

Ratings

Awards and nominations

International broadcast
It began airing in Japan on cable channel KNTV on December 27, 2013.

It began airing in Thailand on digital television MONO29 on 2015.

It began airing across in Southeast Asia on KIX on June 25, 2020 at 10 PM (GMT+8).

Remake
in 2019, Fuji Tv made Japanese adaption of series which Haruma Miura and Kyoko Yoshine in leading roles, it was last works of Miura before his death in 2020

References

External links
  
 Two Weeks at MBC Global Media
 
 

Korean-language television shows
2013 South Korean television series debuts
2013 South Korean television series endings
MBC TV television dramas
South Korean action television series
South Korean thriller television series
Television series by JS Pictures